Great Scott - It's Maynard! was a British television series which aired on the BBC from 1955 to 1956. It was a popular comedy sketch series starring Bill Maynard and Terry Scott, with musical guests including Petula Clark. It was produced by Duncan Wood, and written by Lewis Schwarz, Eric Merriman, Dave Freeman and Johnny Speight.

Although telerecording existed, none of the episodes are known to remain in the BBC archives.

Cast
Terry Scott
Bill Maynard
Shirley Eaton
Hugh Lloyd
Pat Coombs
Marie Benson
Gary Wayne
Dennis Chinnery
The Coronets

References

External links
Great Scott - It's Maynard! on IMDb

1955 British television series debuts
1956 British television series endings
Lost BBC episodes
Black-and-white British television shows
English-language television shows
1950s British comedy television series